The BROACH warhead is a multi-stage warhead developed by Team BROACH; BAE Systems Global Combat Systems Munitions, Thales Missile Electronics and QinetiQ. BROACH stands for Bomb Royal Ordnance Augmented CHarge.

Development of BROACH began in 1991 when Team BROACH consisted of British Aerospace RO Defence, Thomson-Thorn Missile Electronics and DERA. The two stage warhead is made up from an initial shaped charge, which cuts a passage through armour, concrete, earth, etc., allowing a larger following warhead to penetrate inside the target. The weapon is designed to allow a cruise missile to achieve the degree of hard-target penetration formerly only possible by the use of laser-guided gravity bombs.

Applications
 Storm Shadow/SCALP EG
 AGM-154 Joint Standoff Weapon unitary variant (JSOW-C)
 BROACH was evaluated as a possible warhead for the AGM-86D CALCM but was ultimately not selected.

References

BAE Systems weapons systems
Explosive weapons
Military equipment introduced in the 1990s